Mark Altmann is a Paralympic swimming competitor from Australia.  He won a bronze medal at the 2000 Sydney Games in the Men's 50 m Butterfly S7 event. His time was 34.39.

References

Male Paralympic swimmers of Australia
Swimmers at the 2000 Summer Paralympics
Paralympic bronze medalists for Australia
Living people
Medalists at the 2000 Summer Paralympics
Year of birth missing (living people)
Paralympic medalists in swimming
Australian male butterfly swimmers
Australian male medley swimmers
S7-classified Paralympic swimmers
20th-century Australian people
21st-century Australian people